Firouzeh Vokhshouri is a Jordanian diplomat and former member of the Jordanian royal family. She was married to Prince Asem bin Nayef from 1974 through 1985.

Career 
Vokhshouri has been an attaché at the Jordanian Embassy in Madrid since 1992.

References 

1948 births
Living people
Firouzeh
People from Tehran
Jordanian people of Iranian descent
Jordanian women diplomats
Princesses by marriage